Maskowskaya or Maskoŭskaja may refer to:

 Maskowskaya line on the Minsk Metro
Maskoŭskaja (Minsk Metro), a station on the line

See also
  or 
  or